Johannes Teyssen (born 10 September 1959) is a German manager who has been the chairman and chief executive officer (CEO) of E.ON, a German multinational electric utility company, since 2020.

Early life
Teyssen was born on 10 September 1959 in Hildesheim, Germany. He went on to study economics and law at the University of Göttingen from where he graduated in 1984. He then went on to pursue doctoral studies in Boston, US, but returned to Germany to finish in 1991, earning a Doctor of Jurisprudence degree. After that he became a research assistant at Göttingen University.

Career
Teyssen’s first career role was as a law clerk at the State Superior Court in Celle, Germany. He stayed in that position until he joined PreussenElektra in Hanover in 1989. In 1991, after finishing his doctorate, he was promoted by PreussenElektra to head of energy and corporate law. In 1994, he earned another promotion, this time as head of legal affairs after his talent as a litigator was spotted by his superiors.

In 1998, Teyssen joined the Hanover-based power company Hastra in his first executive position as member of the board. One year later, he was named chairman of the board of management at Avacon, based in Helmstedt.

In 2001, Teyssen moved to E.ON Energies AG and two years later became chairman of its management board. In 2004, he was appointed to the board of Fortum (formerly known as E.ON Finland Oyj) and in 2005, he was promoted to chief operating officer and deputy chairman of the board for E.ON Ruhrgas AG and E.ON Energy Trading AG. By 2008, he became COO for the entire group and was later appointed vice chairman and deputy CEO under the leadership of CEO Wulf Bernotat.

In May 2010, Teyssen became CEO of E.ON Group. His tenure has been marked by decisions concerning Germany’s switch to renewable energy, which he cited as a huge opportunity. In January 2012, he spoke out against the European Union Emission Trading Scheme (EU ETS) and in 2013, he questioned the profitability of gas-fired plants. Under his leadership, E.ON agreed in 2018 to buy Innogy from its controlling shareholder RWE, in a transaction that led E.ON to focus on power networks and retail customers. 

In 2015, Teysssen was a member of the search committee to select a new director of the Museum Kunstpalast.

Other activities

Corporate boards
 BP, Non-Executive Member of the Board of Directors (since 2021)
 Nord Stream AG, Member of the Shareholders' Committee (since 2017)
 Innogy, Chairman of the Supervisory Board (2019-2020)
 Deutsche Bank AG, Member of the Supervisory Board (2008-2018)
 Salzgitter AG, Member of the Supervisory Board

Non-profit organizations
 Baden-Badener Unternehmer-Gespräche (BBUG), Member of the Board of Trustees
 Federation of German Industries (BDI), Member of the Presidium (since 2010)
 Stifterverband für die Deutsche Wissenschaft, Member of the Board 
 Kiel Institute for the World Economy (IfW), Member of the Business Advisory Board 
 European Round Table of Industrialists (ERT), Member
 European School of Management and Technology (ESMT), Member of the International Advisory Council
 Eurelectric, President (2013-2015)
 German Committee on Eastern European Economic Relations, Member of the Board (2010-2016)
 World Energy Council, Vice Chair (2006-2012)

Personal life
Teyssen is married with four children.

References

Living people
1959 births
Chief operating officers
German chief executives